Visa requirements for Lithuanian citizens are administrative entry restrictions imposed on citizens of Lithuania by the authorities of other states.  Lithuanian citizens had visa-free or visa on arrival access to 183 countries and territories, ranking the Lithuanian passport 10th (tied with Poland, Slovakia, and Hungary) in terms of travel freedom according to the Henley Passport Index.

Changes
Many countries began relaxing visa restrictions since Lithuanian independence in 1990 including Denmark (1 September 1992), Hungary (September 1992), Czechoslovakia (October 1992), Norway (March 1993), Poland (May 1993), Cyprus (July 1995), Malta (October 1995), Slovenia (May 1996), Bulgaria (December 1996) Iceland (April 1997), Finland (2 November 1997), Switzerland (January 1998), Austria (February 1999), Germany (March 1999), Greece (March 1999), France (March 1999) Chile (May 1999) Portugal (August 1999) Belgium, Luxembourg and Netherlands (November 1999) Spain (April 2000), Uruguay (May 2000), Japan (May 2000) and Israel (June 2000).
Following countries have restored visa for Lithuanian citizens: Kazakhstan (22 October 1993, was resumed in 2017), Moldova (1 November 1993, was resumed in 2006), Russia (19 April 1994)
Since Lithuanian 2004 accession to the European Union (EU), visa restrictions for Lithuanian citizens were relaxed. Following the accession to the European Union in 2004 and the Schengen Area in 2008, visa requirements were lifted by many countries including Macau (February 2002), Hong Kong (February 2002), Slovakia (March 2002), South Korea (April 2002), Albania (May 2003), Serbia and Montenegro (May 2003), Argentina (December 2003) Panama (February 2004) Ukraine (July 2004), Costa Rica (November 2004), Mauritius (November 2004), New Zealand (April 2005), Paraguay (April 2005), Georgia (June 2005), Moldova (7 July 2005), North Macedonia (July 2005), Bosnia and Herzegovina (July 2005), Brunei (1 October 2006), Canada (March 2008), Antigua and Barbuda (2008), Taiwan (November 2008), United States (November 2008), Brazil (January 2009) and Turkey (November 2009).

Recently visa requirements for Lithuanian citizens were also lifted by Kyrgyzstan (July 2012), Armenia (January 2013), the United Arab Emirates, Timor-Leste, Samoa (May 2015), São Tomé and Príncipe (August 2015), Indonesia (October 2015), Tonga (November 2015), Palau (December 2015), Marshall Islands (June 2016), Tuvalu (July 2016), Solomon Islands (October 2016), Kazakhstan (January 2017), Belarus (February 2017), Qatar (August 2017), Cape Verde (1 January 2019), Uzbekistan (1 February 2019),  Thailand (14 April 2019) and Zambia. (1 November 2022) 

Lithuanian citizens were made eligible for eVisas recently by Guinea and Malawi (October 2019), Saudi Arabia (September 2019), Suriname and Pakistan (April 2019), Vietnam (February 2019), Tanzania and Papua New Guinea (November 2018), Uzbekistan (1 July 2018), Ethiopia (1 June 2018), Angola (March 2018), Djibouti (February 2018), Egypt (December 2017), Azerbaijan (January 2017), Tajikistan (June 2016), India (May 2015) and Myanmar (October 2014).

In 2022, Lithuania ranked 9th on the list of countries based on the visa requirements for their citizens. This means that Lithuanians can travel to 182 countries and territories visa-free or can obtain visa on arrival. In 2009 Lithuanian citizens could travel to 125 countries without a visa, to 140 in 2010, and 149 in 2012.

Visa requirements map

Visa requirements

Territories and disputed areas
Visa requirements for Lithuanian citizens for visits to various territories, disputed areas and restricted zones:

Europe
  — Visa required.
  — Visa required (issued for single entry for 21 days/1/2/3 months or multiple entry visa for 1/2/3 months).Travellers with Artsakh visa (expired or valid) or evidence of travel to Artsakh (stamps) will be permanently denied entry to Azerbaijan.
  Mount Athos — Special permit required (4 days: 25 euro for Orthodox visitors, 35 euro for non-Orthodox visitors, 18 euro for students). There is a visitors' quota: maximum 100 Orthodox and 10 non-Orthodox per day and women are not allowed. ID card valid.
  Brest and Grodno — Visa not required for 10 days.
  Crimea — Visa issued by Russia is required.
  — Visa free access for 3 months. Passport or ID card is required.
  UN Buffer Zone in Cyprus — Access Permit is required for travelling inside the zone, except Civil Use Areas.
  — Freedom of movement. ID card valid. 
  Jan Mayen — permit issued by the local police required for staying for less than 24 hours and permit issued by the Norwegian police for staying for more than 24 hours.
  of  — Visa not Required (Unlimited Stay under Svalbard Treaty).
  — visa free for 90 days. ID card valid.
  — Visa free. Multiple entry visa to Russia and three-day prior notification are required to enter South Ossetia.
  — Visa free. Registration required after 24h.

Africa
  — special permit required.
  (outside Asmara) — visa covers Asmara only; to travel in the rest of the country, a Travel Permit for Foreigners is required (20 Eritrean nakfa).
 
  — eVisa for 3 months within any year period.
  — Visitor's Pass granted on arrival valid for 4/10/21/60/90 days for 12/14/16/20/25 pound sterling.
  — Permission to land required for 15/30 pounds sterling (yacht/ship passenger) for Tristan da Cunha Island or 20 pounds sterling for Gough Island, Inaccessible Island or Nightingale Islands.
  — Unlimited Stay
  (Western Sahara controlled territory) — undefined visa regime.
  — visa required (30 days for 30 US dollars, payable on arrival).

Asia
  — Visa not required for 90 days. 
  — Protected Area Permit (PAP) required for all of Arunachal Pradesh, Manipur, Mizoram and parts of Himachal Pradesh, Jammu and Kashmir and Uttarakhand. Restricted Area Permit (RAP) required for all of Andaman and Nicobar Islands and Lakshadweep and parts of Sikkim. Some of these requirements are occasionally lifted for a year.
  — Visa not required for 90 days.
  outside Pyongyang – People are not allowed to leave the capital city, tourists can only leave the capital with a governmental tourist guide (no independent moving)
  Visa not required. Arrival by sea to Gaza Strip not allowed. 
  — Visa not required for 90 days. 
  Gorno-Badakhshan Autonomous Province — OIVR permit required (15+5 Tajikistani Somoni) and another special permit (free of charge) is required for Lake Sarez.
  Tibet Autonomous Region — Tibet Travel Permit required (10 US Dollars).
  Korean Demilitarized Zone — restricted zone.
  UNDOF Zone and Ghajar — restricted zones.

Caribbean and North Atlantic
  — Visa not required for 3 months. 
  — Visa not required for 30 days. 
  — Visa not required. 
  Bonaire, St. Eustatius and Saba — Visa not required for 3 months. 
  — Visa not required. 
  — Visa not required for 6 months. 
  — Visa not required for 3 months. 
  — Visa not required for 6 months. 
  — Visa not required under the Visa Waiver Program, for 90 days on arrival from overseas for 2 years. ESTA required. 
  — Visa not required for 3 months. 
  — Visa not required for 30 days. 
  — Visa not required under the Visa Waiver Program, for 90 days on arrival from overseas for 2 years. ESTA required.

Oceania
  — Electronic authorization for 30 days.
  Ashmore and Cartier Islands — special authorisation required.
  Clipperton Island — special permit required.
  — Visa free access for 31 days.
  — Visa not required under the Visa Waiver Program, for 90 days on arrival from overseas for 2 years. ESTA required. 
  — Visa on arrival valid for 30 days is issued free of charge.
  — 14 days visa free and landing fee US$35 or tax of US$5 if not going ashore.
  — Entry permit required.
  United States Minor Outlying Islands — special permits required for Baker Island, Howland Island, Jarvis Island, Johnston Atoll, Kingman Reef, Midway Atoll, Palmyra Atoll and Wake Island.

South Atlantic and Antarctica
  — Visitor Permit valid for 4 weeks is issued on arrival.
  — Pre-arrival permit from the Commissioner required (72 hours/1 month for 110/160 pounds sterling).

Non-ordinary passports

Holders of various categories of official Lithuanian passports have additional visa-free access to the following countries – Azerbaijan (diplomatic passports), China (diplomatic or service passports), Kazakhstan (diplomatic passports) and Russia (diplomatic passports). Holders of diplomatic or service passports of any country have visa-free access to Cape Verde, Ethiopia, Mali and Zimbabwe.

Non-visa restrictions

Right to consular protection in non-EU countries
When in a non-EU country where there is no Lithuanian embassy, Lithuanian citizens as EU citizens have the right to get consular protection from the embassy of any other EU country present in that country.

See also List of diplomatic missions of Lithuania.

See also
 Visa requirements for the European Union citizens
 Lithuanian passport
 Visa policy in the European Union

Notes and references
Notes

References

Lithuania
Foreign relations of Lithuania